Microdrillia rhomboidales is a species of sea snail, a marine gastropod mollusk in the family Borsoniidae.

Description
The length of the shell attains 9.6 mm.

Distribution
This marine species occurs off the Philippines.

References

 Stahlschmidt P., Poppe G.T. & Tagaro S.P. (2018). Descriptions of remarkable new turrid species from the Philippines. Visaya. 5(1): 5-64. page(s): 6, pl. 1 figs 1-3.

External links
 Worms Link

 
Gastropods described in 2018